Eduardo San Lorenzo Oban Jr (born 13 December 1955) is a graduate of the Philippine Military Academy Class of 1979 and the former Chief of Staff of the Armed Forces of the Philippines. His term as chief of staff began on March 6, 2011 when he succeeded General Ricardo David and ended when he was succeeded by General Jessie Dellosa. On February 22, 2014, Oban was appointed by President Aquino to head the Visiting Forces Agreement Commission.

Early life and education
He was born on December 13, 1955, in Castilla, Sorsogon Philippines. He began his elementary days in Parañaque and finished his college at the University of Santo Tomas before he joined the PMA in 1975, where he belongs to the Philippine Military Academy (PMA) "Matapat" class of 1979. He earned his Master's degree in Business Economics at the University of Asia and the Pacific in Mandaluyong in 2005 when he was then the 5th Fighter Wing's Director for Operations. He also completed courses such as the language training course, pilot training, Squadron Officers Course and the Air Command and Staff Course.

Military Background
After graduating at the PMA in 1979, he held various courses in the Philippine Air Force and the AFP. He also served as a special assistant to the Minister of Trade and Industry from 1984 to 1986, and thereafter as the military assistant to the deputy defense minister before becoming the group commander of the Defense Intelligence and Security Group from November 1986 up to January 1988. He also served as a group commander at the Intelligence and Security Group of the Department of National Defense.

He also held command at two squadrons and as the Director for Operations at the 5th Fighter Wing, and also served as group commander of the Tactical Operations Group 12, as the Executive Officer OJ9, located at the Office of the Deputy Chief of Staff for Capability Materiel and Technology Development, and as an AFP Public Information officer. He also served as commander of the Air Defense Wing and the 1st Air Division.

Oban played a major role in the negotiation with Magdalo rebels involved in the Oakwood mutiny in 2003. He also served as the Deputy Chief of Staff for Plans, J5, and is viewed by many as the perfect back-stop for Former Philippine Air Force (PAF) Chief Lt. General Oscar Rabena, a member of PMA Class 1978 who was also the top AFP planner before he was named to lead the 17,000-strong major service command. He also served as the Vice Commander of the PAF, and prior to the appointment as the Chief of Staff, Oban served as the Deputy Chief of Staff of the AFP, responsible for the administration and supervision of the joint coordinating, technical and special staffs of the military headquarters at Camp Aguinaldo. He took helm as AFP Chief on 8 March 2011, and serves is the third chief of staff to come from the air force since 1996.

Awards in military service

Right Side:

Badges and Other Awards:
  Combat Commander's Badge (Philippines)
  AFP Parachutist Badge
  Philippine Air Force Command and General Staff College Badge
 Golden Aviator Award
 AFP Logistics Eligibility Badge
 PAF Group Commander of the Year Award

Personal life
He is married, and he has one son.

References

Living people
Filipino military leaders
1955 births
People from Sorsogon
Chairmen of the Joint Chiefs (Philippines)
Benigno Aquino III administration personnel
Philippine Military Academy alumni
University of Santo Tomas alumni
University of Asia and the Pacific alumni
Recipients of the Philippine Republic Presidential Unit Citation
Recipients of the Philippine Legion of Honor
Recipients of the Distinguished Service Star
Recipients of the Military Commendation Medal
Recipients of the Silver Wing Medal
Recipients of the Military Merit Medal (Philippines)